Derek Jonathan Penslar,  (born 1958) is an American-Canadian comparative historian with interests in the relationship between modern Israel and diaspora Jewish societies, global nationalist movements, European colonialism, and post-colonial states.

He was raised in Los Angeles, attended Stanford University for his first degree, and then took his graduate degrees at the University of California at Berkeley.  Penslar taught at Indiana University in Bloomington from 1987 to 1998, when he moved to Toronto to assume the Samuel J. Zacks Chair in Jewish History at the University of Toronto.

From 2012 to 2016, he was the inaugural holder of the Stanley Lewis Chair of Israel Studies at the University of Oxford in the United Kingdom. He was a member of the Department of Politics and International Relations and the School of Interdisciplinary Area Studies and a fellow of St Anne's College, where he continues to be an honorary fellow. In 2016, he moved to Harvard University, where he is William Lee Frost Professor of Jewish History.

In 2011, he was made a Fellow of the Royal Society of Canada.

Books

 Zionism and Technocracy:  The Engineering of Jewish Settlement in Palestine, 1870-1918 (1991, Hebrew version 2001)
 In Search of Jewish Community: Jewish Identities in Germany and Austria, 1918-1933 (1998, co-edited with Michael Brenner)
 Shylock's Children: Economics and Jewish Identity in Modern Europe (2001)
 Orientalism and the Jews (co-edited with Ivan Kalmar, 2004)
 Contemporary Antisemitism: Canada and the World (co-edited with Michael Marrus and Janice Gross Stein, 2005)
 Israel in History: The Jewish State in Comparative Perspective (2006)
 Israël face à son passé, with Shlomo Sand, Avi Shlaïm, Les éditions arkhê, 2010
 The Origins of Israel 1882-1948: A Documentary History (co-edited with Eran Kaplan, 2011)
 Jews and the Military:  A History (2013)
 Theodor Herzl: The Charismatic Leader (2020)

References

20th-century Canadian historians
Canadian male non-fiction writers
Jewish Canadian writers
Fellows of the Royal Society of Canada
Academic staff of the University of Toronto
Living people
1958 births
Indiana University Bloomington faculty
Harvard University faculty
21st-century Canadian historians